Two vessels of the Royal Navy have been named HMS Weser for the River Weser:

The British Royal Navy captured her on 21 October 1813. As HMS Weser she served in North American waters and then was sold for breaking up in September 1817.
In 1855, Nix was sold to the Royal Navy in exchange for the sail frigate . Weser saw action during the Crimean War at the Battle of Kinburn in October 1855. Thereafter she was based in Malta. She was ultimately decommissioned in 1865, used as a harbor ship, and then sold to ship breakers in 1873.

Royal Navy ship names